List of speakers and deputy speakers of the House of Assembly of the British Virgin Islands (formerly named the Legislative Council).

Speakers are traditionally appointed from outside the House.  The Deputy Speaker is normally a former elected member of the House, and only exercises function when the Speaker is not available.

Eight people have served as Speaker; six men and two women.  Three of the Speakers also served in the Legislative as elected representatives before or after their time as Speaker.  The longest serving Speaker, by some distance, was Keith L. Flax who served 14 years in the Legislative Council.  No other person has served longer than eight years.  However, prior to the introduction of Ministerial government in 1967, Henry Creque also served as "Clerk" to the Legislative Council (there being no Speaker).  If one includes that period, then the aggregate period served by Henry Creque is 21 years, which is considerably longer.

Speakers of the House

Deputy speakers of the House

Footnotes

Politics of the British Virgin Islands
British Virgin Islands